Whitman could refer to:

People
 Whitman (surname): includes a list of people with the name

Places
In the United States:
 Whitman, Massachusetts
 Whitman (MBTA station)
 Whitman, Minnesota
 Whitman, Nebraska
 Whitman, Philadelphia, Pennsylvania, a neighborhood
 Whitman County, Washington

Education
In the United States:
 Whitman College, an undergraduate college in Walla Walla, Washington
 Whitman College, Princeton University, one of the six residential colleges of Princeton University
 Whitman Center, a branch of Monroe County Community College in Monroe, Michigan
 Martin J. Whitman School of Management at Syracuse University

Other uses
 Whitman's, a chocolatier
 Whitman Publishing
 Whitman River in Massachusetts
 Whitman Corporation, a defunct bottling company, later PepsiAmericas

See also
 Justice Whitman (disambiguation)